Scaphium is a genus of about eight species of plants in the subfamily Sterculioideae of the family Malvaceae.

Species
 Scaphium affine (Mast.) Pierre
 Scaphium burkillfilii Kosterm.
 Scaphium linearicarpum (Mast.) Pierre
 Scaphium longiflorum Ridl.
 Scaphium longipetiolatum (Kosterm.) Kosterm.
 Scaphium macropodum (Miq.) Beumée ex K.Heyne
 Scaphium parviflorum P.Wilkie
 Scaphium scaphigerum (Wall. ex G. Don) G.Planch.

References

External links

POWO: Scaphium

 
Malvaceae genera
Taxonomy articles created by Polbot